German submarine U-926 was a Type VIIC U-boat of Nazi Germany's Kriegsmarine during World War II.

She was ordered on 25 August 1941, and was laid down on 1 July 1942 at Neptun Werft AG, Rostock, as yard number 513. She was launched on 28 December 1943 and commissioned under the command of Oberleutnant zur See Eberhard von Wenden on 29 February 1944.

Design
German Type VIIC submarines were preceded by the shorter Type VIIB submarines. U-926 had a displacement of  when at the surface and  while submerged. She had two shafts and two  propellers.

U-926 was fitted with five  torpedo tubes (four fitted at the bow and one at the stern), fourteen torpedoes or 26 TMA mines, one  SK C/35 naval gun, (220 rounds), one  Flak M42 and two twin  C/30 anti-aircraft guns. The boat had a complement of between 44 — 52 men.

Service history
On 9 May 1945, U-926 surrendered at Bergen, Norway.  Later deemed unseaworthy, she was not transferred to the UK for disposal. U-926 was taken over by the Royal Norwegian Navy and renamed HNoMS Kya (S307), 10 January 1949, she served until 1962.

References

Bibliography

External links

German Type VIIC submarines
U-boats commissioned in 1944
World War II submarines of Germany
Ships built in Rostock
1943 ships
Submarines of the Royal Norwegian Navy